Co-op City station is a planned passenger rail station on the Metro-North Railroad New Haven Line, to be located in Co-op City, Bronx. The station is planned to open in 2027 as part of the Penn Station Access project. The station will be located under Interstate 95 along the southern edge of Co-op City, with two entrances on the north side of the tracks.

History
The Baychester station of the New Haven Railroad was located at the same site. A new station building was designed by Cass Gilbert around 1908, but never built.

A 63-month design-build contract for the project was issued in December 2021.

References

Metro-North Railroad stations in New York City
Railway stations in the Bronx
Co-op City, Bronx
Railway stations scheduled to open in 2027
Stations on the Northeast Corridor
Stations along New York, New Haven and Hartford Railroad lines
Cass Gilbert buildings